Nürnberg-Dürrenhof station is a railway station in Nuremberg, Bavaria, Germany. It is served by the Nuremberg suburban train lines S1 and S2 as well as the Nuremberg tramway line 5. The station is located west of the junction between the Nuremberg–Feucht and Nuremberg–Schwandorf lines.

Operational usage 
The Nürnberg central station is located in the West of the Dürrenhof station, both Harmannshof and Altdorf are in the East. Tramway and bus stations are in the North of the Dürrenhof station.

References

Durrenhof
Dürrenhof